Maizières-la-Grande-Paroisse is a commune in the Aube department in north-central France.

Population
Inhabitants of Maizières-la-Grande-Paroisse are called Maiziérons.

See also
Communes of the Aube department

References

Communes of Aube
Aube communes articles needing translation from French Wikipedia